The 2018 United States House of Representatives election in North Dakota was held on November 6, 2018, to elect the U.S. representative for North Dakota's at-large congressional district. The election coincided with the U.S. Senate election, as well as other statewide, legislative, and local elections.

Though incumbent Republican U.S. Representative Kevin Cramer announced on January 11, 2018, he will run for re-election to a fourth term, he later indicated an intention to run for the United States Senate instead. On February 16, 2018, Cramer announced his Senate campaign.

Republican primary
State Senator Tom Campbell has stated he intends to run for the U.S. Senate if Cramer runs for re-election and to run for the U.S. House if Cramer does not run for re-election. Campbell declared for the seat following Cramer's run for Senate. However, on April 11, Campbell dropped out of the race to endorse Armstrong.

Candidates

Nominated
 Kelly Armstrong, state senator

Declared
 Tiffany Abentroth, U.S. Marine Corps veteran
 Paul Schaffner, oil field employee

Withdrew
 Tom Campbell, state senator

Declined
 Kevin Cramer, incumbent U.S. Representative (running for U.S. Senate)
 Gary Emineth, former chairman of the North Dakota Republican Party

Polling

Results

Democratic-NPL primary
The Democratic-NPL Party held their state convention March 16 and 17, during which delegates voted to endorse Mac Schneider. Although general election ballot access is actually controlled by a Primary Election to be held June 12, both other candidates decided to withdraw from the race, rather than challenge Schneider in the primary.

Candidates

Endorsed
 Mac Schneider, former Minority Leader of the North Dakota Senate

Withdrawn
 Ben Hanson, former state representative
 John Grabinger, state senator

Results

General election

Predictions

Debates

Polling

Results

References

External links
Candidates at Vote Smart
Candidates at Ballotpedia
Campaign finance at FEC
Campaign finance at OpenSecrets

Official campaign websites
Kelly Armstrong (R) for Congress
Mac Schneider (D) for Congress

North Dakota
2018
United States House of Representatives